Iñaki Calvo (born 23 March 1960) is a Venezuelan former professional tennis player.

Born in Caracas, Calvo played for the Venezuela Davis Cup team during the 1980s, appearing in a total of seven ties. He also represented his country in regional multi-sport events, with gold medal wins in mixed doubles at both the 1982 Central American and Caribbean Games and 1983 Pan American Games.

Calvo was a collegiate tennis player for the University of Maryland and their first ever to win the ACC Tournament MVP, which he did as a senior in 1984.

On the professional tour, Calvo reached a career high singles ranking of 373 and featured in the qualifying draw for the 1986 Wimbledon Championships.

References

External links
 
 
 

1960 births
Living people
Venezuelan male tennis players
Maryland Terrapins men's tennis players
Competitors at the 1982 Central American and Caribbean Games
Central American and Caribbean Games medalists in tennis
Central American and Caribbean Games gold medalists for Venezuela
Central American and Caribbean Games bronze medalists for Venezuela
Tennis players at the 1983 Pan American Games
Pan American Games medalists in tennis
Pan American Games gold medalists for Venezuela
Pan American Games bronze medalists for Venezuela
Medalists at the 1983 Pan American Games
20th-century Venezuelan people
21st-century Venezuelan people